Michael Walcott (born 22 March 1952) is a Barbadian cricketer. He played in one first-class match for the Barbados cricket team in 1974/75.

See also
 List of Barbadian representative cricketers

References

External links
 

1952 births
Living people
Barbadian cricketers
Barbados cricketers
Cricketers from Bridgetown